Kjartan Berland (born 28 September 1972) is a Norwegian politician for the Conservative Party.

He was elected as deputy representative to the Parliament of Norway from Akershus for the terms 2013–2017 and 2017–2021. Berland has been a member of Skedsmo municipal council and Akershus county council. He has also been a board member of Lillestrøm SK and the Football Association of Norway.

References 

1972 births
Living people
People from Skedsmo
Norwegian sports executives and administrators
Norwegian businesspeople in the oil industry
Conservative Party (Norway) politicians
Deputy members of the Storting
Akershus politicians